Cycloprop-2-ene carboxylic acid is a mycotoxin found in some mushrooms such as Russula subnigricans.

When ingested, the molecule is known to cause rhabdomyolysis.

In mice, the oral  of this molecule is 2.5 mg/kg and poisoning is indicated by an increase in serum creatine phosphokinase activity. Polymerization via the ene reaction abolishes toxicity.

3-(Cycloprop-2-en-1-oyl)oxazolidinones are a class of ‘unusually stable’ derivatives of cycloprop-2-ene carboxylic acid that have been synthesized by Fox et al. As mentioned by Fox et al, this class of ‘unusually stable’ derivatives are dienophiles when involved in a Diels-Alder reaction.

References

Carboxylic acids
Cyclopropenes
Mycotoxins